Julie Taymor (born December 15, 1952) is an American director and writer of theater, opera, and film. Her stage adaptation of The Lion King debuted in 1997 and received eleven Tony Award nominations, with Taymor receiving Tony Awards for her direction and costume design. Her film Frida, about Mexican artist Frida Kahlo, was nominated for five Academy Awards, including a Best Original Song nomination for Taymor's composition "Burn It Blue". She also directed the jukebox movie musical Across the Universe, based on the music of The Beatles.

Early life

Taymor was born in Newton, Massachusetts, the daughter of Elizabeth (née Bernstein), a political science professor and Democratic activist, and Melvin Lester Taymor, a gynecologist. Taymor's interest in theatre took root early in her life. By age ten, she had joined the Boston Children's Theatre and starred in a number of productions. Being the youngest member of theatre groups became common. By 13, she was taking trips to Boston by herself every weekend, where she discovered Julie Portman's Theatre Workshop. At the age of 15, her parents sent her to both Sri Lanka and India with the Experiment in International Living. After graduating High School at 16, Taymor went to Paris to study with L'École Internationale de Théâtre Jacques Lecoq. Her studies there exposed her to mime, which helped develop her physical sensibilities. While in Paris, Taymor worked with masks for the first time and immersed herself in film, especially the work of Fellini and Kurosawa.

In 1970 Taymor was enrolled in Oberlin College in Ohio. During her second year, she interned with Joseph Chaikin's Open Theatre and other companies in New York City. Hearing that director Herbert Blau was moving to Oberlin, she returned there and auditioned successfully, becoming, once again, the youngest member of a troupe. In 1973, Taymor attended a summer program of the American Society for Eastern Arts in Seattle. The instructors were masters of Indonesian topeng masked dance-drama and wayang kulit shadow puppetry. This would prove to have a great effect on Taymor in later years. Taymor graduated from Oberlin College with a major in mythology and folklore and with Phi Beta Kappa honors in 1974. She spent a summer with Bread and Puppet Theater.

As a college senior, Taymor won a year long Thomas J. Watson Fellowship that began after graduation. The Watson allowed her to travel to Japan and Indonesia which she continued independently from 1975 until 1979. In Indonesia, she developed a mask/dance company, Teatr Loh, consisting of Japanese, Balinese, Sundanese, French, German and American actors, musicians, dancers and puppeteers. The company toured throughout Indonesia with two original productions, Way of Snow and Tirai, which were subsequently performed in the United States. She met her long-time collaborator, Elliot Goldenthal, in 1980.

Taymor was the 2010 commencement speaker for her alma mater, Oberlin College in Oberlin, Ohio.

Career

Theatre
Back in New York from Indonesia, Taymor remounted Tirai at La MaMa in 1980. Her next project, The Haggadah, came from the desire of The Public Theater director Joseph Papp to create an annual Passover pageant that would be culturally inclusive. In 1984, Taymor worked in collaboration with Theatre for a New Audience on a 60-minute version of A Midsummer Night's Dream presented at The Public Theater. Two years later, she directed her first Shakespeare play, The Tempest, for Theatre for a New Audience. She went on to direct three other productions at that theatre, including The Taming of the Shrew, Titus Andronicus and The Green Bird by Gozzi. She later adapted Tempest and Titus into major motion pictures.

Taymor is known for a distinct visual style, with extensive use of puppets and masks, developed largely from her time in Indonesia working with Teatr Loh.

Taymor is most widely recognized for her production of The Lion King, which opened on Broadway in 1997. The Lion King's worldwide gross exceeds that of any entertainment title in box office history, and has been presented in over 100 cities in over 20 countries, having been seen by more than 100 million people worldwide.

Taymor has the distinction of being the first woman to receive the Tony Award for Best Direction of a Musical, which she won for The Lion King. She also received a Tony Award for her original costume designs for the production. Taymor co-designed the masks and puppets, and wrote additional lyrics for the show. In 2007, The Lion King was performed in Johannesburg, and had its first French language production in Paris. In 2008, Le Roi Lion was awarded Best Costume Design, Best Lighting Design, and Best Musical at the Molière Awards, the national theatre awards of France.

In 2000, Taymor directed Carlo Gozzi's The Green Bird on Broadway. The work was first produced in 1996 by Theatre for a New Audience at the New Victory Theater and presented at the La Jolla Playhouse. Taymor's stage production of Shakespeare's Titus Andronicus was produced off-Broadway by Theatre for a New Audience in 1994. Other directing credits include The Tempest, The Taming of the Shrew, The Transposed Heads, based on the novella by Thomas Mann, co-produced by the American Musical Theater Festival and The Lincoln Center; and Liberty's Taken, an original musical co-created with David Suehsdorf and Elliot Goldenthal.

Her original music-theatre work, Juan Darién: A Carnival Mass, presented at Lincoln Center's Vivian Beaumont Theater in 1996, received five Tony Award nominations including Best Director. Originally produced by Music Theater Group in 1988, Juan Darién: A Carnival Mass was directed by Taymor, and co-written with Elliot Goldenthal. The recipient of two Obies and numerous other awards, the piece was performed at The Edinburgh International Festival, as well as festivals in France, Jerusalem and Montreal, and had an extended run in San Francisco.

In April 2007, it was announced that a musical adaptation of Spider-Man was being prepared for Broadway. Taymor was selected to direct the show and write the book with Glen Berger. The production features music and lyrics by Bono and The Edge. The musical, Spider-Man: Turn Off the Dark, was scheduled to begin previews on November 28, 2010, at the Foxwoods Theatre. The play was delayed for several months due to numerous injuries, and Taymor was fired and replaced by Philip William McKinley. The play officially opened on June 14, 2011, having set the record for the longest preview period in the history of Broadway at 182 performances. The production also set the record for most expensive Broadway production at an estimated $75 million. In November 2011, Taymor sued show's producers, Michael Cohl and Jeremiah J. Harris, claiming that they were profiting from her creative contributions without compensating her.  Taymor and the producers reached a settlement in August 2012.

Taymor was a 2015 inductee into the Theater Hall of Fame for Lifetime Achievement in the American Theater.

Taymor directed a Broadway revival of David Henry Hwang's M. Butterfly, starring Clive Owen, which opened on October 26, 2017, at the Cort Theatre, with previews beginning on October 7. David Henry Hwang made changes to the original text for the revival, mostly centering on the issue of intersectional identities.

Stage production history
Way of Snow (1974–75, 1980) – writer, director, and designer in Java and Bali and The Ark Theater, New York City
Tirai (1978–79, 1981) – writer, director, and designer in Java and Bali and La MaMa, New York City
The Haggadah (1980) – sets, costumes, masks, and puppetry produced for the NY Shakespeare Festival/Public Theater, New York City
Black Elk Lives (1981) – sets, masks, and puppetry produced at Intermedia Theater, New York City
The King Stag (1984) – costumes, masks, puppetry and choreography produced at ART, Cambridge, MA
Liberty's Taken (1985) – director, masks, and puppetry produced at the Castle Hill Festival, MA
The Transposed Heads (1984, 1986) – director, masks, and puppetry produced at The Ark Theater, NYC and Lincoln Center
The Tempest (1986, by Shakespeare, abridged) – director, puppetry. produced for Theatre for a New Audience at Classic Stage Company (NYC)
The Taming of the Shrew (1988, by Shakespeare) – director, produced by Theatre For a New Audience
Juan Darién: A Carnival Mass (1988, 1990, 1996) – director, co-bookwriter, co-scenic designer, co-costume designer, mask designer, puppet designer– Tony Award co-nomination for Best Scenic Design, Tony Award nomination for Best Direction of a Musical
Oedipus Rex (1992, by Igor Stravinsky) – director, puppetry. at Sito Kinen Festival in Matsumoto (taped for TV, released 1993 / released DVD)
The Magic Flute (1993, by Mozart – director, costume designer, masks and puppetry designer by Taymor and Michael Curry
Titus Andronicus (1994, by Shakespeare) – director, produced by Theatre For a New Audience
The Flying Dutchman (1996, by Richard Wagner) – director
Salome (1995 premiere at Passionstheater, Oberammergau, Germany) directed and choreographed by Taymor and Andreas Liyepa
The Lion King (1997) – director, lyricist for the song "Endless Night", costume designer, co-mask designer, co-puppet designer– Tony Award winner for Best Direction of a Musical, Tony Award co-nomination for Best Original Score, Tony Award winner for Best Costume Design
The Green Bird (1996, 2000) – director, mask designer, puppet designer produced by Theatre for a New Audience at the New Victory Theater (1996), La Jolla, and on Broadway at the Cort Theatre (2000)
The Magic Flute (premiered 2005, opera by Mozart) – director, Metropolitan Opera (NY), live broadcast
The Magic Flute (2006), newly translated and abridged version, Metropolitan Opera, Opera Australia (2012)
Grendel (2007, opera by Elliot Goldenthal) – librettist, director, co-commissioned and performed at The LA Opera and The Lincoln Center Festival
Spider-Man: Turn Off the Dark (2010, musical adaptation of Spider-Man) – director, co-author, mask designer, Broadway at the Foxwoods Theatre
A Midsummer Night's Dream (2013) – director, TFANA, Polonsky Shakespeare Center
Grounded (2015) – director, The Public Theater
M. Butterfly (2017) – director, Broadway at the Cort Theatre

Film

Taymor's first film, Fool's Fire, which she co-directed and adapted from Edgar Allan Poe's short story, Hop-Frog, was produced by American Playhouse. The hour-long film premiered at the Sundance Film Festival and aired on PBS in March 1992. In the film, all characters except the titular character Hop-Frog are either elaborate puppets or masks, not unlike Taymor's stage work. The film won the Best Drama award at the Tokyo International Electronic Cinema Festival.

Taymor also directed a film adaptation of opera Oedipus Rex after directing a stage production of the same opera. The film premiered at the Sundance Film Festival and won the Jury Award at the Montreal Festival of Film on Art. Broadcast internationally in 1993, the film garnered an Emmy Award and the 1994 International Classical Music Award for Best Opera Production.

Taymor's feature film debut, Titus (1999), starring Anthony Hopkins, Jessica Lange, Alan Cumming and Jonathan Rhys Meyers, was an adaptation of Shakespeare's play Titus Andronicus. Taymor adapted the screenplay and produced the film, which received an Academy Award nomination for costume design.

Taymor received critical acclaim for her direction of Salma Hayek and Alfred Molina in Frida, the true story of the Mexican artist Frida Kahlo. Frida garnered six Academy Award nominations, including a Best Actress nomination for Hayek, and won two Academy Awards for make-up and original score. Frida was honored with four BAFTA nominations and one win, including nominations for Hayek and Molina, as well as two Golden Globe nominations, winning the Golden Globe for Best Original Score. In addition, the film received two Screen Actors Guild nominations. The film premiered at the Venice Film Festival where it won the festival's Mimmo Rotella Foundation Award.

Her next film was the jukebox musical Across the Universe (2008), which received a Golden Globe nomination for Best Musical/Comedy as well as an Academy Award for Costume Design. With a collection of 33 Beatles songs, the film stars Evan Rachel Wood and Jim Sturgess in a 1960s love story set to the music of The Beatles, and featured performances by Bono, Joe Cocker, Eddie Izzard and Salma Hayek. Taymor both directed and co-wrote the story for the film.

In November 2008, Taymor directed a film version of Shakespeare's The Tempest, released in December 2010 starring Helen Mirren, Alfred Molina, Djimon Hounsou and Ben Whishaw. Working behind the camera with Taymor on The Tempest were the Academy Award winners Elliot Goldenthal for music, Sandy Powell for costumes, and Françoise Bonnot. Taymor produced the feature and adapted the screenplay based on Shakespeare's play.

She also completed a cinematic version of William Shakespeare's A Midsummer Night's Dream, starring David Harewood, Max Casella and Kathryn Hunter, and filmed during her critically acclaimed, sold-out stage production that ran at Theatre for a New Audience's new home in Downtown Brooklyn. The film was shown at the 2014 Toronto International Film Festival as part of the Mavericks in Film Programme.

Taymor directed and co-wrote The Glorias, a biopic of feminist icon Gloria Steinem, based on her novel My Life on the Road, starring Julianne Moore, Alicia Vikander, Bette Midler, and Janelle Monae. The movie premiered at the Sundance Film Festival and was released by Amazon Prime on September 30, 2020.

Filmography

Executive producer
 The Lion King (2019)

Recorded plays/Opera

Opera
Taymor's first opera direction was of Stravinsky's Oedipus rex, for the Saito Kinen Orchestra in Japan, under the baton of Seiji Ozawa in 1992. The opera featured Philip Langridge as Oedipus and Jessye Norman as Jocasta. Taymor went on to direct the film adaptation of the opera Oedipus Rex.

She went on to direct Wagner's The Flying Dutchman for the Los Angeles Opera in a co-production with the Houston Grand Opera.

She directed Richard Strauss' Salome for the Kirov Opera in Russia, Germany, and Israel under the baton of Valery Gergiev. Taymor's first direction of The Magic Flute, was for the Maggio Musicale Fiorentino in Florence, with Zubin Mehta conducting in 1993. Over a decade later, Taymor premiered The Magic Flute at the Metropolitan Opera in 2004. The show is now in repertoire there. A newly translated and abridged English version of the opera premiered at the Met in December 2006, and inaugurated a new series on PBS in 2010 entitled, Great Performances at the Met as well as launched the Metropolitan Opera Live in HD series of movie-theater transmissions.

In June 2006, Taymor directed the premiere of Elliot Goldenthal's opera Grendel for the Los Angeles Opera, starring Eric Owens, which was also presented as part of the Summer 2006 Lincoln Center Festival in New York City. A darkly comic retelling of the Beowulf tale based on the novel by John Gardner, the opera was co-commissioned by the Los Angeles Opera and the Lincoln Center Festival. The opera was a finalist for the Pulitzer Prize for Music in 2007.

For the Metropolitan Opera 2005/06 season, Taymor directed a successful production of The Magic Flute. It was revised for the 2006/07 season and, in addition to full-length performances, was adapted for a 100-minute version over the holiday season to appeal to children. That version of the opera was the first of a series of NCM Fathom Live on the Big Screen presentations of MET operas downloaded via satellite to movie theaters across North America and parts of Europe for the 2006/07 season. In 2012, Opera Australia produced this version with locally built scenery and props at the Sydney Opera House, the Arts Centre Melbourne, and the Queensland Performing Arts Centre in Brisbane.

Books
The Lion King: Pride Rock on Broadway, Hyperion Books, 1998, 
 Titus: The Illustrated Screenplay, Newmarket Press, 2000, 
 (with Eileen Blumenthal and Antonio Monda) Julie Taymor: Playing with Fire, Harry N. Abrams, Inc., 2007, 
 (with Salma Hayek) Frida: Bringing Frida Kahlo's Life and Art to Film, Newmarket Press, 2009, 
 The Tempest (screenplay adapted from the play by William Shakespeare), Abrams Books, 2010,

Exhibition
A major retrospective of 25 years of Taymor's work, titled 'Playing With Fire' opened in the fall of 1999 at the Wexner Center for the Arts and toured the National Museum of Women in the Arts (Washington D.C.) in 2000  and the Field Museum of Natural History (Chicago) in 2001, and was extended due to popular demand in each venue.

In September 2009, costumes from The Lion King were requested and presented to the Smithsonian National Museum of American History and they are now part of the Smithsonian collection as well as the Victoria and Albert Museum in London.

Awards and nominations
In 1991, Taymor won the prestigious MacArthur Fellowship. In addition, Taymor has received a Guggenheim Fellowship, two Obie Awards, the first Annual Dorothy B. Chandler Award in Theater, the Brandeis Creative Arts Award, and the Golden Plate Award of the American Academy of Achievement.

Theatre

Television

Film

See also
 List of female film and television directors
 List of LGBT-related films directed by women

References

Further reading
Blumenthal, Eileen, and Taymor, Julie. Julie Taymor, Playing with Fire : Theater, Opera, Film New York: H.N. Abrams, 1995

External links

Julie Taymor at the Internet Off-Broadway Database

Interview with Julie Taymor – Subtitles to Cinema
Julie Taymor profile at PBS website
Julie Taymor on THIRTEEN'S NYC-ARTS talking about her first Shakespeare production with Theatre for a New Audience

1952 births
Living people
American costume designers
20th-century American Jews
Screenwriters from New York (state)
American theatre directors
Primetime Emmy Award winners
American women film directors
Helpmann Award winners
Laurence Olivier Award winners
MacArthur Fellows
Oberlin College alumni
American opera directors
Female opera directors
Artists from Boston
Tony Award winners
Watson Fellows
American women screenwriters
People from Garrison, New York
Women theatre directors
L'École Internationale de Théâtre Jacques Lecoq alumni
Film directors from New York (state)
Screenwriters from Massachusetts
21st-century American Jews
Fulbright alumni